Die Wiesingers is a German television series.

See also
List of German television series

External links
 

1984 German television series debuts
1988 German television series endings
Television shows set in Bavaria
Television series set in the 1900s
Television series set in the 1910s
Television series set in the 1920s
Television series set in the 1930s
German-language television shows
Das Erste original programming